Vilotić is a surname. Notable people with the surname include:

Milan Vilotić (born 1986), Serbian footballer
Stevan Vilotić (1925–1989), Yugoslav football manager

See also
Vilotijević

Serbian surnames